Mattice-Val Côté is an incorporated township in Cochrane District in Northeastern Ontario, Canada.

The township was incorporated on April 18, 1975, as the United Townships of Eilber and Devitt, with Paul Zorzetto as first reeve. Its two primary population centres are Mattice and Val-Côté. Mattice is located on the Missinaibi River, a historic fur-trading route that flows into the Moose River, then into James Bay.  The river is a popular destination for canoers, known for its historical significance.

History

Mattice was founded in the 1910s, fueled by the arrival of the Canadian Transcontinental Railway and free land given away by the government.  Most residents came from the province of Quebec.

The town was named after Gregor Lenox Mattice. He was born July 26, 1872 in Cornwall Township, Ontario, Canada, and died April 1, 1940 in Montreal, Quebec, Canada. Major Gregor Lenox Mattice was educated at the Royal Military College, Kingston, Ontario, Canada, and graduated as a civil engineer. For a time he was with the Grand Trunk Pacific Railway (now the Canadian National Railway) as District Engineer, with headquarters at Cochrane, Ontario. He had charge of construction between Hearst and Cochrane. When the road was completed, the field office was named Mattice in his honor. When a town built up around the field office, the town was also named Mattice.

The history of Mattice-Val-Côté and its residents is detailed in the two volume book Si Missinaïbi m'était conté.  Volume I tells the story of the original settlers in the early 1920s.  Volume II tells the story of their descendants.

Economy
A majority of residents work in nearby Hearst and Opasatika in the lumber industry. Opasatika's mill is now shut down. Other residents work in the service industry.

A group of local women entrepreneurs have banded together to open a clothing company which manufactures polar fleece clothing, ideal for the cold winter conditions of the area.

Tourist attractions
The Municipality of Mattice-Val-Côté has set up a rest and camp area on the right bank of the Missinaibi River so that canoe enthusiasts can sleep, shower, rest and visit the sites.  The municipality has also erected a sculpture depicting a voyageur portaging along the river.

Mattice is home to a historical First Nations cemetery, located two kilometers south of town.  It had been abandoned in the 1940s but has now been cleaned up and can be accessed by road or by canoe on the Missinaibi River.

A rock museum opened in Val-Côté in 2002.

Festivals
The Carnaval Missinaïbi (winter carnival) is held over the course of two weeks in the end of February/beginning of March every winter.  Activities include snowmobile rallies, music concerts, and kids activities.  The Carnaval is best known in the area for its generous prizes (vehicles and money) given away in the Carnival draw.

The first "journées médiévales" (Medieval Days) took place in the summer of 2006, inspired by a similar activity in a small Quebec town. The festival takes place at the baseball field of Mattice on the last weekend of August. This festival features the naming of a king and queen for the day, a competition to become a knight, a lot of family activities, a variety of different expositions and a meal without utensils.

Canadian Rivers Day has been celebrated for four years with organized trips on the Missinaibi River, educational sessions and family activities.

Sports
Residents and visitors enjoy outdoor sports such as hunting, fishing, snowmobiling, camping, swimming and canoeing.  It is a popular spot for anglers and hunters.

Education
The local grade school is called École catholique St-François-Xavier where students go from kindergarten to grade 8. High school students are bussed to École Secondaire catholique Hearst.

Demographics 

See also
List of townships in Ontario
List of francophone communities in Ontario

References

External links

Hudson's Bay Company trading posts
Municipalities in Cochrane District
Single-tier municipalities in Ontario
Township municipalities in Ontario